Oscar Clark (born February 20, 1989 in Atlanta, Georgia) is an American former road racing cyclist, who competed professionally between 2010 and 2017 for the , Realcyclist.com Cycling Team and  squads.

Major results
2012
1st Stage 5 Tour of China II
2013
1st Stage 5 Flèche du Sud
2016
1st The Reading 120
1st Fort McLellan Road Race
2017
1st Bucks County Classic

References

External links
 
 
 

1989 births
Living people
American male cyclists
Sportspeople from Atlanta